Tales of Rohnlief is an album by the American composer, saxophonist and clarinet player Joe Maneri, with bassist Barre Phillips and violinist Mat Maneri. It was recorded in 1998 and released on the ECM label.

Reception
The AllMusic review by Dave Lynch stated: "Tales of Rohnlief is music for the adventurous listener with time to savor its subtleties. But those with ears tuned to more conventional musical rules should still find plenty of beauty, warmth, and even humor in this recording".

Track listing
All compositions by Joe Maneri, Mat Maneri and Barre Phillips except as indicated
 "Rohnlief" (Joe Maneri, Barre Phillips) - 8:34 
 "A Long Way from Home" (Joe Maneri, Phillips) - 13:08 
 "Sunned" (Mat Maneri) 3:30 
 "When the Ship Went Down" - 7:02 
 "The Aftermath" (Mat Maneri, Phillips) - 3:28 
 "Bonewith"  - 5:43 
 "Flaull Clon Sleare" (Joe Maneri) - 2:36 
 "Hold the Tiger" - 1:51 
 "Canzone Di Peppe" - 3:28 
 "The Field" - 3:18 
 "Nelgat" - 4:07 
 "Elma My Dear" (Joe Maneri, Phillips) - 3:23 
 "Third Hand" (Mat Maneri) - 2:02 
 "Pilvetslednah" (Joe Maneri) - 2:44

Personnel
Joe Maneri - clarinet, alto saxophone, tenor saxophone, piano, voice
Barre Phillips - double bass
Mat Maneri - electric 6 string violin, baritone violin

References

 

1999 albums
ECM Records albums
Joe Maneri albums